In the Pendulum's Embrace is an album by the Australian ambient musician Oren Ambarchi. It was released by Touch Music on CD in 2007, and by Southern Lord Records in 2008 on 2LP. It was recorded at BJB Studios in Sydney.

Track listing
 "Fever, A Warm Poison" - 17:54
 "Inamorata" - 10:19
 "Trailing Moss in Mystic Glow" - 12:36

References

External links
Southern Lord Records
 

2007 albums
Oren Ambarchi albums
Southern Lord Records albums
Ambient albums by Australian artists
Touch Music albums